Sklyayevo is a rural locality (a selo) and the administrative center of Sklyayevskoye Rural Settlement, Ramonsky District, Voronezh Oblast, Russia. The population was 547 as of 2010. There are 5 streets.

Geography 
Sklyayevo is located 29 km northwest of Ramon (the district's administrative centre) by road. Nizhnyaya Vereyka is the nearest rural locality.

References 

Rural localities in Ramonsky District